The American Pet Association is a pet organization founded in 1991 in Atlanta, Georgia. It is formed as an LLC out of Florida and has offices in Georgia, South Carolina, Florida and Colorado.

The Executive Director is Richard Werner and was one of the founding members of the organization.  There are at least 25 employees at the organization.

The organization is based as a membership organization for pet owners providing "Guardian" and "Guardian VIP" memberships since 1992. As of August 2011, they have over 250,000 members.

Since 1995, they have provided media services including research and statistics to the media.

In 1996, they started offering "Humane Services" donating their Guardian Memberships to humane agencies as well as dry erase kennel ID cards, employees badges, educational materials, pet collars and fundraising assistance at no charge to the humane agency.

In 2009, they began offering "Pet Mediation" services aimed at helping businesses and couples experiencing pet related disputes. Also in 2009 they launched a "Scholastic Fundraising"  program aimed at helping schools raise funds and educating children on proper pet care. This is a not for profit program.

In 2010, it launched a Pet Product and Pet Business Approval Program. They have a proprietary business approval process and provide testing, inspections, background checks and an ongoing consumer feedback system.

In 2011, it launched a "Community Pet Plan" program offering "Planned Pet Communities" to residential apartment complexes and other communities. They help to establish communities as "pet friendly", manage pet complaints and provide mediation.

References

Pets in the United States
Animal welfare organizations based in the United States